Francisco Javier de Morales y Castejón de Arroyo was a Spanish soldier and interim governor of Chile from March 1770 to March 1772.

Sources 
 Diego Barros Arana, Vicuña Mackenna, Carlos Tomás,  Historia jeneral de Chile Tomo VI, Published by R. Jover, 1886.  Original from Harvard University, Digitized Sep 12, 2008, 483 pages
 Parte Quinta Capitulo IIX  pp. 316–338

Royal Governors of Chile
18th-century Spanish people
Year of death unknown
Year of birth unknown